These are the records of Persepolis F.C. and their statistics in Asian football competitions. They have won the Asian Cup Winners' Cup once (in 1990–91) and were also runners-up once in 1992–93. Persepolis have finished third place on three occasions and finished in fourth place once in the Asian Club Championship. They were also emerged as runners-up of the AFC Champions League in 2018 and 2020.

The first international game of that Persepolis played was on 26 July 1968 in Tehran, against the South Korean Army team.

Overall 
Persepolis was the first Iranian team to participate in the Asian Champion League. Persepolis earned three victories against Shahrbanai, Oghab and Pas, and a draw with Taj, to qualify for the 1969 Asian Cup. Persepolis was eliminated after two wins, a draw and a defeat in the group stage, and failed to reach the next two rounds.

AFC did not hold any club competitions on the continent from 1971 to 1985 due to political and security problems, and the opposition of the Arab countries with the presence of Israel in the competition.

Persepolis' second appearance in the Asian Cup came after winning the Hazfi Cup; Persepolis was eliminated by Mohammed Bangladesh, whose coach was Nasser Hejazi.

Following the introduction of the Asian Cup Winners' Cup, Persepolis qualified for the tournament on three occasions. In their first appearance in the competition, they won the title, and finished as runners-up on the second occasion.

In the 1990s (before the solar decade of the 1370s), and the early years of the new millennium, Persepolis participated in four editions of the AFC Champions League, reaching the semi-finals on each occasion. They subsequently reached the competition's final in 2018 and 2020, losing on both occasions.

 Correct as of 16 October 2021
Only official matches included (AFC Champions League and Asian Cup Winners' Cup matches).

Record by country of opposition
Correct as of 16 October 2021

 P – Played; W – Won; D – Drawn; L – Lost

Year by year performance
Below is a table of the performance of Persepolis in Asian competition.
{| class="wikitable"
|-
!Season
!Competition
!Round
!Against
!Played
!Won
!Drew
!Lost
!GF
!GA
|-
|align=center|1969
|align=center|Club Championship
|align=center|Group Stage
|align=center| —
|align=center|4
|align=center|2
|align=center|1
|align=center|1
|align=center|8
|align=center|3
|-
|align=center|1970
|rowspan=5 colspan=9 align=center| Did not qualify for AFC competitions
|-
|align=center|1971
|-
|align=center|1985–86
|-
|align=center|1986
|-
|align=center|1987
|-
|align=center|1988–89
|align=center|Club Championship
|align=center|Qualifying Group Round
|align=center| —
|align=center|2
|align=center|1
|align=center|0
|align=center|1
|align=center|6
|align=center|2
|-
|align=center|1989–90
|colspan=9 align=center| Did not qualify for AFC competitions
|-
|align=center|1990–91
|align=center|Cup Winners' Cup
|align=center bgcolor=gold| Winners 
| Muharraq 
|align=center|6
|align=center|4
|align=center|2
|align=center|0
|align=center|15
|align=center|2
|-
|align=center|1991–92
|colspan=9 align=center| Did not qualify for AFC competitions
|-
|align=center|1992–93
|align=center|Cup Winners' Cup
|align=center bgcolor=silver|Runners-up
| Nissan 
|align=center|8
|align=center|3
|align=center|4
|align=center|1
|align=center|8
|align=center|5
|-
|align=center|1993–94
|align=center|Cup Winners' Cup
|align=center|Quarter-finals
| Al-Arabi 
|align=center|4
|align=center|1
|align=center|1
|align=center|2
|align=center|4
|align=center|5
|-
|align=center|1994–95
|rowspan=2 colspan=9 align=center| Did not qualify for AFC competitions
|-
|align=center|1995
|-
|align=center|1996–97
|align=center|Club Championship
|align=center bgcolor=#c96|Third Place
| Al-Zawraa 
|align=center|9
|align=center|5
|align=center|1
|align=center|3
|align=center|17
|align=center|12
|-
|align=center|1997–98
|align=center|Club Championship
|align=center bgcolor=#9acdff|Fourth Place 
| Al-Hilal 
|align=center|7
|align=center|3
|align=center|2
|align=center|2
|align=center|6
|align=center|7
|-
|align=center|1998–99
|colspan=9 align=center| Did not qualify for AFC competitions
|-
|align=center|1999–2000
|align=center|Club Championship
|align=center bgcolor=#c96|Third Place
| Bluewings 
|align=center|7
|align=center|3
|align=center|3
|align=center|1
|align=center|5
|align=center|2
|-
|align=center|2000–01
|align=center|Club Championship
|align=center bgcolor=#c96|Third Place
| Irtysh 
|align=center|9
|align=center|5
|align=center|3
|align=center|1
|align=center|19
|align=center|8
|-
|align=center|2001–02
|colspan=9 align=center| Did not qualify for AFC competitions
|-
|align=center|2002–03
|align=center|Champions League
|align=center|Group Stage
|align=center| —
|align=center|3
|align=center|2
|align=center|0
|align=center|1
|align=center|5
|align=center|2
|-
|align=center|2004
|rowspan=5 colspan=9 align=center| Did not qualify for AFC competitions
|-
|align=center|2005
|-
|align=center|2006
|-
|align=center|2007
|-
|align=center|2008
|-
|align=center|2009
|align=center|Champions League
|align=center|Round of 16
| Bunyodkor
|align=center|6
|align=center|3
|align=center|1
|align=center|2
|align=center|8
|align=center|8
|-
|align=center|2010
|colspan=9 align=center| Did not qualify for AFC competitions
|-
|-
|align=center|2011
|align=center|Champions League
|align=center| Group stage
|align=center| —
|align=center|6
|align=center|1
|align=center|2
|align=center|3
|align=center|6
|align=center|11
|-
|align=center|2012
|align=center|Champions League
|align=center| Round of 16	
| Al-Ittihad
|align=center|7
|align=center|3
|align=center|2
|align=center|2
|align=center|14
|align=center|8
|-
|align=center|2013
|rowspan=2 colspan=9 align=center| Did not qualify for AFC competitions
|-
|align=center|2014
|-
|align=center|2015
|align=center|Champions League
|align=center| Round of 16	
| Al-Hilal
|align=center|8
|align=center|5
|align=center|0
|align=center|3
|align=center|8
|align=center|10
|-
|align=center|2016
|colspan=9 align=center| Did not qualify for AFC competitions
|-
|align=center|2017
|align=center|Champions League
|align=center bgcolor=#c96| Semi-finals	
| Al-Hilal
|align=center|12
|align=center|4
|align=center|6
|align=center|2
|align=center|17
|align=center|17
|-
|align=center|2018
|align=center|Champions League
|align=center bgcolor=Silver|Runners-up
| Kashima Antlers
|align=center|14
|align=center|7
|align=center|3
|align=center|4
|align=center|17
|align=center|12
|-
|align=center|2019
|align=center|Champions League
|align=center| Group stage
|align=center| —
|align=center|6
|align=center|2
|align=center|1
|align=center|3
|align=center|6
|align=center|5
|-
|align=center|2020
|align=center|Champions League
|align=center bgcolor=Silver|Runners-up
| Ulsan Hyundai
|align=center|10
|align=center|5
|align=center|2
|align=center|3
|align=center|13
|align=center|8
|-
|align=center|2021
|align=center|Champions League
|align=center| Quarter-finals
| Al-Hilal
|align=center|8
|align=center|6
|align=center|0
|align=center|2
|align=center|15
|align=center|8
|-
|align=center|2022
|align=center colspan=9|Qualified for Champions League but failed to obtain an AFC license.
|-
|}

Records

Asian Cup Winners' Cup

Winners: 1
Asian Cup Winners' Cup 1990–91
(Oct 4 & 18, 1991)

|}

Runners-Up: 1
Asian Cup Winners' Cup 1992–93
(Jan 17 & Apr 16, 1993)

|}

AFC Champions League

Runners-Up: 2
AFC Champions League 2018
(Nov 3 & 10, 2018)

|}
AFC Champions League 2020
(Dec 19, 2020)

 Top goalscorers in Asia 
Below is the list of most goalscorer of Persepolis in Asia.
 Bold names denote a player still playing for club.''

Hat-tricks

Honours
AFC Champions League
Runners-up (2): 2018, 2020

Asian Club Championship
Third place (3): 1996–97, 1999–00, 2000–01  
Fourth place (1): 1997–98

Asian Cup Winners' Cup
'''Champions (1): 1990–91
Runners-up (1): 1992–93

See also 
Iranian clubs in the AFC Champions League
AFC Champions League
Asian Cup Winners' Cup

References

Asia
Iranian football club statistics